The 2021–22 Iraq Division Three will be the 48th season of the Iraq Division Three, the fourth tier in the Iraqi football league system, since its establishment in 1974. The number of clubs in the league have varied throughout history for various reasons; 173 clubs are set to participate in this 
year's edition. The top 38 teams in the league are promoted directly to Iraq Division Two. There is no general date for the start of the league, but each subsidiary football association chooses the best time to start the league in their region.

Teams
A total of 173 teams are competing for the league after some teams withdrew for financial reasons. The teams are originally promoted to the Iraq Division Two based on the rule of one qualified team out of every five participating teams. The number of teams that will be promoted to the Division Two will be 38 teams.

Overview 
The 173 clubs are supposed to be divided into 18 groups by location (some of these groups play in subgroups as well), and each group represents the province to which these clubs belong and lies within its borders. But there are 5 provinces that do not have clubs that play in this level.

League table

Diyala Province League

Group 1

Group 2

Karbala Province League

Group 1

Group 2

Babil Province League

Group 1

Group 2

Group 3

Maysan Province League

Dhi Qar Province League

References

External links
 Iraq Football Association

2021–22 in Iraqi football
Football leagues in Iraq
Fourth level football leagues in Asia